Rearin' Back is an album by saxophonist Sonny Stitt recorded in 1962 and released on the Argo label.

Reception
Down Beat magazine's Harvey Pekar said in his April 11, 1963 review that "Stitt solos brilliantly... Stitt conceives and executes extremely complex passages so easily that some have come to take his work for granted."

The Allmusic site awarded the album 3 stars.

Track listing 
All compositions by Sonny Stitt except as indicated
 "Rearin' Back" - 5:15   
 "Wee" (aka Allen's Alley) (Denzil Best) - 4:04 (mistitled as the standard We on the original LP)   
 "Little Girl Blue" (Lorenz Hart, Richard Rodgers) - 3:34   
 "Cut Plug" - 4:13   
 "Queen" - 7:00   
 "Carpsie's Groove" - 6:10   
 "Bunny R." - 6:14

Personnel 
Sonny Stitt - alto saxophone
Ronnie Mathews - piano  
Arthur Harper - bass
Lex Humphries - drums

References 

1962 albums
Argo Records albums
Sonny Stitt albums
Albums produced by Esmond Edwards